Olrog's four-eyed opossum (Philander olrogi) is a South American species of opossum found in eastern Bolivia, first described in 2008 based on specimens collected in 1974. It inhabits the lowland Amazon rainforest, with an elevation range of 150 to 250 m. The species is named after Swedish-Argentine biologist Claes C. Olrog. It is sympatric with P. opossum, which it resembles. The two species differ in several ways, such as ventral fur color and condition of the zygomatic arch.

References

Opossums
Mammals of Bolivia
Mammals of Peru
Mammals described in 2008